Giannis Sampson (born 6 December 1981 in Paphos, Cyprus) is an English Cypriot football defender who played for AEP Paphos in the Cypriot First Division.

His former teams are AEL Limassol and APOEL. During his spell with APOEL, he won the Cup on 2006 and the Championship on 2007.

External links

1981 births
Living people
Cypriot footballers
Association football defenders
English people of Greek Cypriot descent
AEP Paphos FC players
APOEL FC players
AEL Limassol players
Cypriot First Division players
Evagoras Paphos players